John Cairns may refer to:

John Cairns (biochemist) (1922–2018), biochemist who first demonstrated the structure and replication of the E. coli genome
John Cairns (cricketer) (1925–2014), English cricketer
John Cairns (politician) (1859–1923), British politician, MP for Morpeth
John Cairns (1818–1892), Scottish divine and writer
John Cairns (1857–1922), United Presbyterian Church minister, writer and biographer
John Cairns (born 1942), former moderator of the general assembly of the Church of Scotland
John Cairns (footballer) (1902–1965), Scottish football forward

See also
David Cairns (politician) (John David Cairns, 1966–2011), British politician, MP for Inverclyde
John Cairnes (disambiguation)